The Ghana A' national football team is the local national football team of Ghana and is open only to indigenous domestic league players. The team represents Ghana at the WAFU Nations Cup and the African Nations Championship and is controlled by the Ghana Football Association. Previously known as the Local Black Stars, the team is known as the Black Galaxies.

The Local Black Stars came second at the 2009 African Nations Championship, at the 2014 edition hosted in South Africa, Ghana reached the final again but lost in a penalty shoot-out to the Libya.

They have also appeared at the WAFU Nations Cup 4 times, hosting the tournament twice and winning the on both occasions in 2013 and 2017. The current coach of the side is Annor Walker. Maxwell Konadu and Ibrahim Tanko are former head coaches of the side.

Results

Squad

Previous squads 

 African Nations Championship squads

 CHAN 2009 squad
 CHAN 2011 squad

 CHAN 2014 squad
 CHAN 2022 squad

Coaching staff 
As of 15 April 2021

Current technical staff 

Last updated: April 2021

Source: Ghana Football Association official website

Previous Head Coaches 

  Milovan Rajevac (2009)
  Herbert Addo (January 2010– February 2011)

  Maxwell Konadu (November 2013–December 2020)
  Ibrahim Tanko (December 2020–April 2021)

Competitive record

African Nations Championship

Honours 
African Nations Championship:

 Second place: 2009, 2014

WAFU Nations Cup

 Champions: 2013, 2017

See also 

 Ghana national football team

 Ghana Women's national team

References

External links 

 Ghana A' on Soccerway

National A' association football teams
Ghana national football team